Kalne  is a village (selo) in Stryi Raion, Lviv Oblast, of  Western Ukraine. Village Kalne is located in the Ukrainian Carpathians within the limits of the Eastern Beskids (Skole Beskids) in southern Lviv Oblast. Kalne belongs to Slavske settlement hromada, one of the hromadas of Ukraine. 
Local government — Khitarska village council.

The first written record indicates that the date of foundation is considered to be  1608.

Until 18 July 2020, Kalne belonged to Skole Raion. The raion was abolished in July 2020 as part of the administrative reform of Ukraine, which reduced the number of raions of Lviv Oblast to seven. The area of Skole Raion was merged into Stryi Raion.

In the village is the church of St.. Arch. Michael (1820) and a wooden Bell Tower built in 1837.

References

External links 
 weather.in.ua 
 Кальне, церква Св. Арх. Михайла (1820) 

Villages in Stryi Raion